Gonioterma mistrella is a moth of the family Depressariidae. It is found in North America, where it has been recorded from Mississippi, Missouri, Ohio, Illinois, Texas, Kansas, Pennsylvania, New Mexico, Manitoba and Mexico.

The wingspan is 20–23 mm. The forewings are light ochreous, minutely speckled and overlaid with darker brown scales. At the end of the cell is a small but conspicuous round black dot. The hindwings are dark fuscous. Adults are mainly on wing from May to October.

The larvae feed on Phleum pratense. The larvae are pink with a dark dorsal stripe and a chestnut head.

References

Moths described in 1907
Gonioterma